STAR voting is an electoral system for single-seat elections. Variations also exist for multi-winner and proportional representation elections. The name (an allusion to star ratings) stands for "Score then Automatic Runoff", referring to the fact that this system is a combination of score voting, to pick two finalists with the highest total scores, followed by an "automatic runoff" in which the finalist who is preferred on more ballots wins. It is a type of cardinal voting electoral system.

Method
In STAR, voters are given a score ballot (or ratings ballot) on which each voter scores candidates with a number from 0 up to 5, with 0 representing "worst" and 5 representing "best."

The scores for each candidate are then summed, and the two highest-scored candidates are selected as finalists.

In the automatic runoff round, the finalist who was given a higher score on a greater number of ballots is selected as the winner.

Usage 
The concept was first proposed in October 2014 by Mark Frohnmayer, and was initially called score runoff voting (SRV). The runoff step was introduced in order to reduce strategic incentives in ordinary score voting, such as bullet voting and tactical maximization. Thus, STAR is intended to be a hybrid between (rated) score voting and (ranked) instant runoff voting.

The first movement to implement STAR voting was centered in Oregon, with chapters in Eugene, Portland, Salem, Astoria, and Ashland. In July 2018, supporters submitted over 16,000 signatures for a ballot initiative in Lane County, Oregon, putting Measure 20-290 on the November 2018 ballot.  This ballot measure almost passed, with 47.6% of voters voting yes, and 52.4% of voters voting no.

In 2019, the Multnomah County Democratic Party adopted STAR for all internal elections.

A 2020 ballot initiative for the city of Eugene (in which a 54% majority had supported the 2018 county initiative) was attempted, as well as a second attempt at Lane County, and an initiative in Troutdale, Oregon. On July 27, 2020, after the Eugene City Council deadlocked at 4-4 on a vote to refer a measure allowing STAR voting to be used in city elections to the November 2020 ballot, Eugene Mayor Lucy Vinis cast the deciding vote against the referral, meaning that no Eugene ballot measure would be held in 2020.

The Independent Party of Oregon used STAR voting in their 2020 primary election. The Democratic Party of Oregon used STAR Voting for their elections for delegates to the 2020 Democratic covention. In 2022, the Libertarian Party of Oregon authorized STAR voting for its internal elections starting in 2023.

Example

Suppose that 100 voters each decided to score from 0 to 5 stars each city such that their most liked choice got 5 stars, and least liked choice got 0 stars, with the intermediate choices getting an amount proportional to their relative distance.

The top-two frontrunners are Nashville and Chattanooga. Of the two, Nashville is preferred by 68% (42+26) to 32% (15+17) of voters, so Nashville, the capital in real life, likewise wins in the example.

For comparison, note that traditional first-past-the-post would elect Memphis, even though most citizens consider it the worst choice, because 42% is larger than any other single city. Instant-runoff voting would elect the 2nd-worst choice (Knoxville), because the central candidates would be eliminated early.  Under score voting, Nashville would have won, since it had the highest score in the first round. In approval voting, with each voter selecting their top two cities, Nashville would also win because of the significant boost from Memphis residents. A two-round system would have a runoff between Memphis and Nashville, where Nashville would win.

In this particular case, there is no way for any single city of voters to get a better outcome through tactical voting. However, Chattanooga and Knoxville voters combined could vote strategically to make Chattanooga win; while Memphis and Nashville voters could defend against that strategy and ensure Nashville still won by strategically giving Nashville a higher rating and/or Chattanooga and Knoxville lower ratings.

Ties
Tie votes in STAR Voting are rare, but as with any voting method they can occur, especially in elections without many voters. In most cases, ties in STAR voting can be broken by referring back to the ballots themselves for either the Scoring or Runoff round. Ties in the Scoring round are broken in favor of the candidate who was preferred by more voters. Ties in the Runoff round are broken in favor of the candidate who was scored higher. Ties which cannot be broken as above are considered a true tie.

Variations

STAR Voting can be used for multi-winner elections as in Bloc STAR voting or it can be used for proportional representation elections using Proportional STAR Voting, also known as STAR-PR.

Proportional STAR Voting: Each voter scores all the candidates on a scale from 0 up to 5. The results are tabulated using a proportional STAR algorithm such as Allocated Score or Sequentially Spent Score.

Properties
Unlike ranked voting systems, STAR voting allows voters to express preferences of varying strengths, though unlike Score voting, it does not take voters' strength of preference into account in 2-candidate elections.

STAR voting satisfies the monotonicity criterion, i.e. raising your vote's score for a candidate can never hurt their chances of winning, and lowering it can never help their chances. It also satisfies the resolvability criterion (in both Tideman and Woodall's versions).

It does not satisfy the Condorcet criterion (i.e., is not a Condorcet method), although with all-strategic voters and perfect information, the Condorcet winner is a strong Nash equilibrium. It does, however, satisfy the Condorcet loser criterion and the majority loser criterion.

There are a number of other voting system criteria it does not fully satisfy.  These include the majority criterion, since the highest-rated candidates that proceed to the runoff may not be the first preference of a majority. It does not satisfy the mutual majority criterion, although the more candidates there are in the mutual majority set, the greater the chances that at least one of them is among the two finalists in the runoff, in which case one of them will win. It does not always satisfy reversal symmetry (though it only violates it for exactly three candidates).

It also violates participation, consistency; and independence of clones (where any clones of the highest rated candidate may receive almost the same rating and enter the runoff, ahead of the second most popular non-clone).

It does not satisfy the later-no-harm criterion, meaning that giving a positive rating to a less-preferred candidate can cause a more-preferred candidate to lose.

Discussion of STAR's criteria compliances
FairVote, an organization that promotes the use of instant-runoff voting, argues that STAR's failure of the majority criterion and the later-no-harm criterion is problematic. STAR advocates have responded, noting that STAR satisfies a relaxed version of the majority criterion, and always elects the majority preferred finalist (of all voters who have a preference between the finalists), and that the system better balances the competing, incompatible favorite betrayal and later-no-harm criteria, resulting in superior voter satisfaction, as demonstrated by simulations in which STAR performs better than many other methods, including Instant Runoff voting.

See also
 List of democracy and elections-related topics
 Consensus decision-making
 Decision making
 Democracy
 Relative Utilitarianism
 Usual judgment—similar voting method, based on medians instead of averages and verbal appreciations instead of notes 
 Majority judgment
 Unified Primary—alternate voting method for nonpartisan blanket primary that uses approval voting-based method in runoff election

Notes

External links
 STAR voting
 The Equal Vote Coalition, an advocacy organization for STAR voting and other reforms.
 ★.✓ An online platform for carrying out STAR voting elections.

Electoral systems
Single-winner electoral systems
Cardinal electoral systems
Monotonic electoral systems